2 is the second album by Australian folk-rock band Ned Collette + Wirewalker, released in 2012.

The title is a reference to the album being the second released under that band name, but also reflects the fact that the album is essentially a collaboration between Collette and longtime collaborator Joe Talia, with regular Wirewalker member Ben Bourke taking time off to be with his young family in Melbourne. Parts of the album were recorded with the two artists working separately—Collette in Berlin and Talia in Melbourne—although Talia spent six weeks in Berlin in mid-2011 to expand the recordings before Collette returned to Melbourne for final mixing. It features guest vocals by Gemma Ray and Laura Jean, among others. The album also features "For Roberto", an instrumental tribute to late Chilean writer Roberto Bolaño.

Track listing
All tracks by Ned Collette, music by Ned Collette & Wirewalker

"Il Futuro Fantastico" – 5:39
"Stampy" – 4:16
"The Hedonist" – 4:16
"How to Change a City" – 5:55
"The Decision" – 4:54
"Long You Lie" – 5:00
"Happy Heart" – 1:47
"For Roberto" – 3:24
"What Lights Have You Seen?" – 4:13

Personnel
 Ned Collette – voice, guitar, bass, synths, drums, drum machine
 Joe Talia – drums, drum machine, synths, revox
 Byron Scullin – saxophone ("Il Futuro Fantastico")
 Gemma Ray – vocals ("The Decision")
 Mirjam Smejkal – vocals ("The Hedonist")
 Laura Jean – vocals ("How to Change a City")
 Biddy Connor – vocals ("How to Change a City")
 Sascha Gersak – vocals ("Long You Lie")

References

Ned Collette albums
2012 albums
Fire Records (UK) albums
Dot Dash Recordings albums